

Great Britain vs New Zealand

Cameroon vs Brazil

New Zealand vs Brazil

Great Britain vs Cameroon

New Zealand vs Cameroon

Great Britain vs Brazil

References

Group E
2012 in Brazilian women's football
2012–13 in New Zealand association football
Great Britain at the 2012 Women's Olympic Football Tournament
2012 in Cameroonian football